= Microlia amici =

Scientific classification
- Kingdom: Animalia
- Phylum: Arthropoda
- Class: Insecta
- Order: Coleoptera
- Suborder: Polyphaga
- Infraorder: Staphyliniformia
- Family: Staphylinidae
- Genus: Microlia
- Species: M. amici

Binomial name
- Microlia amici Bortoluzzi & Caron, 2016

Species of beetle

Microlia amici is a species of rove beetle first found in Brazil. It is a pollen-feeder. The species differs from M. meticola by possessing abdominal segments that are darker; mesotarsus with 5 segments; a seventh tergum without tubercles in the male; and the eighth tergum of the male being emarginated in the posterior margin.
